Fredericton was a New Brunswick electoral district. It was separated from the riding of York from 1924 until it was absorbed back into York in 1926. The riding was recreated in 1967 and existed until 1973 when New Brunswick went from bloc voting to single-member ridings.

Members of the Legislative Assembly

Election results

1967–1973

1924–1926

Notes

Former provincial electoral districts of New Brunswick
1974 disestablishments in New Brunswick